Graphium delessertii, the Malayan zebra, is a butterfly of the family Papilionidae (swallowtails). It is found in Southeast Asia. The rare female resembles Ideopsis gaura. Despite the rarity of females Graphium delessertii is a common species, although threatened by deforestation in Java.

Subspecies
Graphium delessertii delessertii (Peninsular Malaya, Sumatra, Java, Bangka, Natuna, Borneo)
Graphium delessertii hyalinus (Fruhstorfer, 1901) (Nias)
Graphium delessertii palawanus (Staudinger, 1889) (Philippines: Palawan, Balabac)

References

Page, M.G.P & Treadaway, C.G.  2003 Schmetterlinge der Erde, Butterflies of the world Part XVII (17), Papilionidae IX Papilionidae of the Philippine Islands. Edited by Erich Bauer and Thomas Frankenbach Keltern: Goecke & Evers; Canterbury: Hillside Books. 

delessertii
Butterflies of Borneo
Butterflies of Java
Butterflies of Indochina
Butterflies described in 1839